Karl Hoffmann (1883 – 30 November 1951) was a German architect. His work was part of the architecture event in the art competition at the 1928 Summer Olympics.

References

1883 births
1951 deaths
20th-century German architects
Olympic competitors in art competitions
Place of birth missing